"", also known as the "" ("Anthem of Bonaire") and originally the "" ("Bonairean Anthem"), is the anthem of Bonaire, a special municipality of the Netherlands in the Caribbean. From 1964 to 2000, it also served as the anthem of the Netherlands Antilles.

Since 15 December 1981, "Tera di Solo y suave biento" has been the official anthem of Bonaire, after its text and melody were made law in the island decree dated 11 December 1981, No. 2.

Lyrics

Notes

References

External links
Lyrics

Dutch anthems
Papiamento-language mass media
North American anthems
National anthems
1960s songs
Song articles with missing songwriters
Year of song missing